The Indonesian Chamber of Commerce and Industry or KADIN is an association of business organisations in Indonesia. Members of this organisation consist of entrepreneurs or a combination of national businesses from various sectors, both private-owned enterprises, cooperatives and government-owned enterprises. Kadin is headquartered in Jakarta, but it functions in coordinating, consultation and cooperation of chambers of commerce throughout Indonesia.

The organisation was founded on 24 September 1968 and regulated in Act No. 1 of 1987. The aim is to develop Indonesian entrepreneurs based on a noble, clean, transparent, and professional soul, as well as productive and innovative which must foster and develop balanced and synergistic, harmonious cooperation, both at sectoral and cross-sectoral, inter-scale, regional, national and international level, in the context of creating a healthy and dynamic business climate to encourage equal distribution of business opportunities to the maximum extent of the Indonesian business world in participating in carrying out national and regional economic development.

History
The formation KADIN was on 24 September 1968 by the Level I Regional KADIN or Level I KADINDA (the term for the Provincial KADIN at that time) that existed throughout Indonesia on the initiative of the DKI Jakarta KADIN, and was recognised by the government with Presidential Decree No. 49 in 1973. It was re-established in accordance with the provisions of Law Number 1 of 1987 concerning the Chamber of Commerce and Industry in the Indonesian Employers' Conference on 12 August 1994 in Jakarta organised by Indonesian Businessmen incorporated in the Indonesian Chamber of Commerce and Industry in cooperation with the Indonesian Cooperative Council (Dekopin) and representatives are established for an unspecified period of time.

Law Number 1 of 1987 concerning the Chamber of Commerce and Industry stipulates that all Indonesian entrepreneurs in the field of state business, cooperative businesses and private businesses jointly form the organisation of the Chamber of Commerce and Industry as a forum and vehicle for guidance, communication, information, representation, consultation, the facilitation and advocacy of Indonesian entrepreneurs, in the context of realising a strong and highly competitive business world that is based on the real superiority of national resources, which integrates equally between the inter-national economic potential links, namely between sectors, between business scales, and between -area, in the dimensions of orderly law, business ethics, humanity, and environmental sustainability in a market economy in the global economic arena based on regional power, business sector, and foreign relations.

Functions
Kadin is a non-government organization. It acts as a forum for communication and consultation between Indonesian entrepreneurs and between Indonesian entrepreneurs and the government, on matters relating to trade, industry and service issues. The functions of the organization includes as follows,
Spread information about government policies in the economic field to Indonesian entrepreneurs;
Conveying information on problems and developments in the world economy in their effects on the national economy and business world to the government and entrepreneurs
Channeling the aspirations and interests of entrepreneurs in the trade sector;
Organizing education, training and activities of Indonesian entrepreneurs;
Organizing and enhancing mutually supporting and mutually beneficial relations and cooperation between Indonesian entrepreneurs;
Carrying out efforts to maintain harmony on the other hand by preventing unfair competition;
Organizing and improving relations and cooperation between Indonesian businessmen and foreign businessmen with the aim of National Development;
Organizing domestic and foreign promotions, statistical analysis, and business information centers;
Fostering harmonious work relations between workers and employers;
 Carry out efforts to balance and preserve nature in efforts to prevent damage and pollution.

In addition to carrying out the aforementioned activities, in the context of fostering Indonesian businessmen and creating a healthy and orderly business climate, the Chamber of Commerce and Industry can develop:
^Services both in the form of granting certificates, mediation, arbitration, and recommendations regarding Indonesian entrepreneurs, including the Legalization of documents required for the smooth running of their business.
Any other tasks given by the government.

List of Chairman of KADIN
The tenure of Chairman of KADIN is five years. Before 1993, the tenure of chairman was three years. Here are the names that were once the Chairperson:

See also
Chamber of commerce

References

Organizations based in Jakarta
Organizations established in 1968
Chambers of commerce
1968 introductions